"Faster Horses (the Cowboy and the Poet)" is a song written and recorded by American country music artist Tom T. Hall. It was released in December 1975 as the second single from the album, Faster Horses. Members of the Western Writers of America chose it as one of the Top 100 Western songs of all time.

Background
A young poet encounters a cowboy in a local bar and is struck by his thin, worn appearance from years of hard work. Sensing the cowboy has words of inspiration to share, the poet approaches the cowboy, who responds that the only good things in life are "faster horses, younger women, older whiskey and more money." He goes on to explain that "to pray for peace and rain" is just a wish to be prosperous, which to him is "buffalo chips." The poet responds that he has no interest in any of those things, but the cowboy calls him a liar.

The irritated poet grabs the cowboy to fight but relents when a weapon is pulled on him. In the end, the would-be poet swears off philosophical pursuits and, pondering what he would say if his son asked him the meaning of life, suggests he would recite the cowboy's list.

Senate reference 
The chorus was given in evidence to a U.S. Senate subcommittee by the banking consultant Alex Sheshunoff:

Chart performance 
The song was Hall's final number one on the Billboard Hot Country Singles chart, spending one week at the top and a total of 13 weeks within the chart's top 40.

Weekly charts

Year-end charts

References

External links 
 

1975 singles
Tom T. Hall songs
Songs written by Tom T. Hall
Song recordings produced by Jerry Kennedy
1975 songs
Mercury Records singles
Songs about cowboys and cowgirls